Constantin Sekeris was a Greek biochemist and molecular biologist.

Early life 
He was born in Nafplio, the first capital of Greece and his paternal family home. During World War II, he accompanied his parents to Egypt, South Africa, and finally the United States (U.S.), where his father held ministerial posts in the Greek Government in exile. The family stayed in the U.S. until 1944, when, following the liberation of Greece after the defeat of Nazi Germany, they returned permanently to Greece. 
After his secondary education at the 8th Gymnasium of Athens, he graduated from the Medical School of the National and Kapodistrian University of Athens in 1956. After completion of Army service he joined the team of Prof. Peter Karlson at the Institut für Physiologische Chemie of the Ludwig Maximilian University of Munich. He completed his doctoral degree in biochemistry in 1962 from the Medical School of the Ludwig Maximilian University of Munich.

Career 
In 1964 Sekeris accompanied Karlson when he moved to the position of Director of the Institut für Physiologische Chemie of the Philipps University of Marburg. In 1966 he became a Privatdozent at the Medical School where, in 1970, he was promoted to “Wissenschaftlicher Rat und Professor”, and then to a C3 Professor. In 1974 he moved to the German Cancer Research Centre (Deutsches Krebsforschungszentrum) in Heidelberg as the Head of the Section “Molecular Biology of the Cell” and a professor at the Science Faculty of Heidelberg University. In 1977, he finally moved home to Greece as a Professor of Biochemistry at the University of Athens, first at the Department of Biology and then (1993) at the Medical School. During his tenure at the University of Athens he held a joint appointment at the Institute of Biological Research at the National Hellenic Research Foundation, serving as its Director. In 2000, he reached the mandatory retirement age for the Greek Public Service, but kept performing research, unofficially, up until his death in 2009. 

Sekeris’ main research interest was the mode of action of steroid hormones. He started his research working on tyrosine metabolism in insects and then rapidly moved to molecular endocrinology, where he stayed. Building on the work of Adolf_Butenandt (Karlson's father-in-law and director of the Munich Institute), Karlson and Sekeris early on proposed a model on how steroids function, which was very loosely based on Jacob and Monod's model for the regulation of the lactose operon of Escherichia coli. He concentrated his later work on steroid receptor(s) including the binding of glucocorticoid receptor to mitochondrial DNA, which he and his group first described. His overall focus could be described as the elucidation of the role of glucocorticoids in the regulation of gene expression and cellular metabolism. This research led to research on post-transcriptional events such as mRNA processing. He was the first to describe the presence of small RNA species involved in the processing of hnRNA. He published more than 250 papers  and book chapters, making him one of Greece's most prolific scientists in non-clinical life sciences.

In addition to his long-term directorship of the Institute of Biological Research at the National Hellenic Research Foundation, Sekeris was involved in science administration both in Greece and abroad. He was a member of the Greek Research Council and acted as the Chief Executive Officer of the National Hellenic Research Foundation. Among different honours that he received during his career one should mention his election to the European Molecular Biology Organization (EMBO) and the European Academy of Sciences. After leaving Germany he was made an Honorary Professor of Cell Biology at the Science Faculty of Heidelberg University.

Family 
Sekeris was a direct descendant of Panagiotis Sekeris, a merchant and ship owner who lived in Constantinople in the early 19th century and co-founded the Filiki Eteria (a secret society aiming to overthrow the Ottoman rule in Greece), and who spent his entire wealth financing this process. Sekeris married Lioka (Kalliope), born Platsouka (passed away in 1997) and then Evi, born Protopappa. He was survived by one son, Evangelos a member of the Hellenic Diplomatic Corps, three grandchildren (Kalliope, Katherine and Constantine) and his three siblings, two brothers (Giorgos and Thanassis) and one sister (Kalliope).

References 

1933 births
2009 deaths
Biochemists
Greek chemists
Academic staff of Heidelberg University
Ludwig Maximilian University of Munich alumni
Molecular biologists
Academic staff of the National and Kapodistrian University of Athens
Academic staff of the University of Marburg
People from Nafplion